Argosy, later titled The Argosy, Argosy All-Story Weekly and The New Golden Argosy,  was an American pulp magazine from 1882 through 1978, published by Frank Munsey until its sale to Popular Publications in 1942. It is the first American pulp magazine. The magazine began as a children's weekly story–paper entitled The Golden Argosy. In the era before the Second World War, Argosy was regarded as one of the "Big Four" pulp magazines (along with Blue Book, Adventure and Short Stories), the most prestigious publications in the pulp market, that many pulp magazine writers aspired to publish in. John Clute, discussing the American pulp magazines in the first two decades of the twentieth century, has described The Argosy and its companion The All-Story as "the most important pulps of their era."

Launch of The Golden Argosy

In late September 1882, Frank Munsey had moved to New York City to start Argosy, having arranged a partnership with a friend already in New York and working in the publishing industry, and with a stockbroker from Augusta, Maine, Munsey's previous home. Munsey put most of his money, around $500, into purchasing stories for the magazine.

Once he was in New York, the stockbroker backed out, and Munsey decided to release his New York friend from involvement, since they were now hopelessly underfunded. Munsey then pitched the magazine to a New York publisher, and managed to convince him to publish the magazine and hire Munsey as editor.

The first issue was published on December 2, 1882 (dated December 9, 1882, a common practice at the time and since, to date a magazine issue with the latest date it should be the current one), and came out weekly. The first issue was eight pages, cost five cents, and included the first installments of serialized stories by Horatio Alger, Jr., and Edward S. Ellis.

Other authors associated with Argosy’s early days include Annie Ashmoore, W. H. W. Campbell, Harry Castlemon, Frank H. Converse, George H. Coomer, Mary A. Denison, Malcolm Douglas, Colonel A. B. Ellis, J. L. Harbour, D. O. S. Lowell, Oliver Optic, Richard Handfield Titherington, Edgar L. Warren and Matthew White, Jr. White would become the Argosys editor from 1886 to 1928.

Five months after the first issue, the publisher went bankrupt and entered receivership. By placing a claim for his unpaid salary, Munsey managed to assume control of the magazine. It was a very unlikely financial proposition; subscriptions had been sold that had to be fulfilled, but Munsey had almost no money, and credit from printers and other suppliers was impossible to come by. Munsey borrowed $300 from a friend in Maine, and managed to scrape along as he learned the fundamentals of the publishing industry.

Munsey found that targeting children had been a mistake, as they did not stay subscribed for any length of time, since they grew out of reading the magazine. Additionally, children did not have much money to spend, which limited the number of advertisers interested in reaching them.

Shift towards pulp fiction
In December 1888 the title was changed to The Argosy. Publication switched from weekly to monthly in April 1894, at which time the magazine began its shift towards adult fiction, on its way to pioneering the pulp-magazine format and eventually becoming the first home of pulp fiction. It eventually published its first all-fiction issue in 1896. The all-fiction Argosy launched a new genre of magazines, and is considered the pioneer among pulp magazines. During the period 1906-1907, The Argosy was selling 500,000 copies per issue.Blek, Patrick Scott, Empires of Print: Adventure Fiction in the Magazines, 1899-1919 Taylor and Francis, 2017   (p.11).

The magazine switched back to a weekly publication schedule in October 1917. In January 1919, The Argosy merged with Railroad Man's Magazine, and was briefly known as Argosy and Railroad Man's Magazine.

Prior to World War One, The Argosy had several notable writers, including Upton Sinclair, Zane Grey, Albert Payson Terhune, Gertrude Barrows Bennett (under the pseudonym Francis Stevens), and former dime novelist William Wallace Cook.

The All-Story

The All-Story Magazine was another Munsey pulp. Debuting in January 1905 (the word "Magazine" was dropped from the title in 1908), this pulp was published monthly until March 1914. Effective March 7, 1914, it changed to a weekly schedule and the title All-Story Weekly. In May 1914, All-Story Weekly was merged with another story pulp, The Cavalier, and used the title All-Story Cavalier Weekly for one year. Editors of All-Story included Newell Metcalf and Robert H. Davis.

The All-Story is the magazine that first published Edgar Rice Burroughs, beginning with "Under the Moons of Mars", a serialized novel eventually published in book form as A Princess of Mars, and later The Gods of Mars. Other All-Story writers included Rex Stout, later a famed mystery writer, and mystery writer Mary Roberts Rinehart, Western writers Max Brand and Raymond S. Spears, and horror and fantasy writers Tod Robbins, Abraham Merritt, Perley Poore Sheehan and Charles B. Stilson. All-Story also published poetry. One notable writer who published poems in the All-Story was Djuna Barnes.

The now largely forgotten Eldred Kurtz Means (March 11, 1878 - February 19, 1957) was a constant and prolific contributor to pulp magazines such as All-Story Weekly, Argosy and its predecessors, often featuring blackface minstrel show dialogue. 

In 2006, a copy of the October 1912 issue of The All-Story, featuring the first appearance of the character Tarzan in any medium, sold for $59,750 in an auction held by Heritage Auctions of Dallas.

Argosy All-Story Weekly

In 1920, All-Story Weekly was merged into The Argosy, resulting in a new title, Argosy All-Story Weekly, which published works in a number of literary genres, including science fiction and Westerns. Edgar Rice Burroughs published some of his Tarzan and John Carter of Mars stories in the magazine; other science fiction writers included Ralph Milne Farley, Ray Cummings, Otis Adelbert Kline and A. Merritt.

In 1922 Argosy missed a chance to launch the career of E. E. Smith. Bob Davis, then editor of Argosy, rejected the manuscript of The Skylark of Space, writing to Smith that he liked the novel personally, but that it was "too far out" for his readers. This "encouraging rejection letter" did encourage Smith to try further, finally getting his novel published in Amazing Stories.

Argosy published a number of adventure stories by Johnston McCulley (including the Zorro stories), C. S. Forester (adventures at sea), Theodore Roscoe (French Foreign Legion stories), L. Patrick Greene, (who specialized in narratives about Africa), and George F. Worts' tales about Peter the Brazen, an American radio operator who has adventures in China. H. Bedford-Jones wrote a series of historical swashbuckler stories for Argosy about an Irish soldier, Denis Burke. Borden Chase appeared in Argosy with crime fiction. Two humorous mystery-adventure serials by Lester Dent appeared in Argosy's pages. More serious mystery stories were represented by Cornell Woolrich, Norbert Davis, and Fred MacIsaac.

Max Brand, Clarence E. Mulford, Walt Coburn, Charles Alden Seltzer and Tom Curry wrote Western fiction for the magazine. Other authors who appeared in the original run included Ellis Parker Butler, Hugh Pendexter, Robert E. Howard, Gordon MacCreagh and Harry Stephen Keeler. Brand's character Dr. Kildare first appeared in 1938.

Argosy's covers were drawn by several noted magazine illustrators, including Emmett Watson, Edgar Franklin Wittmack, Paul Stahr, Modest Stein and Robert A. Graef.

In November 1941 the magazine switched to biweekly publication, then monthly publication in July 1942. The most significant change occurred in September 1943 when the magazine not only changed from pulp to slick paper but began to shift away from its all-fiction content. Over the next few years the fiction content grew smaller (though still with the occasional short-story writer of stature, such as P. G. Wodehouse), and the "men's magazine" material expanded. By the late 1940s, it had become associated with the men's adventure genre of "true" stories of conflict with wild animals or wartime combat.

In the late 1940s and 1950s Argosy experienced a significant boost in sales when it began running a new true crime column, The Court of Last Resort. Lawyer-turned-author Erle Stanley Gardner (the creator of Perry Mason) enlisted assistance from police, private detectives, and other professional experts to examine the cases of dozens of convicts who maintained their innocence long after their appeals were exhausted. The popular column appeared in Argosy from September 1948 until October 1958, and was adapted for television as a 26-episode series by NBC.

By the 1970s, it was racy enough to be considered a softcore men's magazine. The final issue of the original magazine was published in November 1978.

Revivals
The magazine was revived briefly from 1990 to 1994 by Richard Kyle. Kyle had intended to revive the publication in the mid 1980s, but his financing collapsed.  He had, however commissioned Jack Kirby to create a strip based on his early life in New York. Although Kyle was unable to secure fresh financing, he pushed ahead with publication in 1990. Issue 2 of the revived magazine included Kirby's "Street Code", shot as intended from the finished pencils. Kyle's revival lasted only five issues, published sporadically. A quarterly published slick revival began in 2004. It briefly went on hiatus before resuming publication in 2005 as Argosy Quarterly''', edited by James A. Owen. The focus of that version was on new, original fiction. It was only published into 2006. Starting December 2013, the Argosy name has been revived again as a digital and print-on-demand publication, with the emphasis on pulp fiction by modern writers. In 2016, Altus Press revived Argosy''.

See also
Works originally published in Argosy

References

External links

Checklist of Argosy covers
Founding of the Munsey Publishing House, published in 1907 on their 25th anniversary
Argosy All-Story Weekly Article at the "Newsstand: 1925" website
A History of The Argosy at the Pulp Magazines Project
The Golden Argosy (1882-1888) at the HathiTrust
The Argosy (1888-1920) at the HathiTrust
Argosy All-Story Weekly (1920-1929) at the HathiTrust
Altus Press

1882 establishments in New York (state)
1978 disestablishments in New York (state)
Children's magazines published in the United States
Men's magazines published in the United States
Weekly magazines published in the United States
Defunct literary magazines published in the United States
Magazines established in 1882
Magazines disestablished in 1978
Magazines published in New York City
Men's adventure magazines
Pulp magazines